MBL deficiency is a pathology of the innate immune system involving Mannan-binding lectin pathway components such as MBL2.

It is thought that 5–10% of the population have an MBL deficiency of some degree. There are varying degrees of MBL deficiency; some people will not even know they have the deficiency, while others may have such low levels that they experience infections with great frequency. Babies and young children are most at risk.

References

External links 

Complement deficiency